The Expedition of Abu Musa Al-Ashari, took place in January 630 AD or 8AH, 10th month, of the Islamic Calendar, in Autas.

After Abu Amir was ordered to chase the enemies who fled the Battle of Hunayn, he was killed in the expedition, his nephew Abu Musa then pursued the killers and killed them, and captured others.

Background
Muhammad ordered Abu Amir al-Ashari to chase the enemies who fled during the Battle of Hunayn, Abu Musa (who is Abu Amir's nephew was among them). Abu Amir chased them but was killed in the expedition. The standard was then taken by Abu Musa Al-Ashari who became the commander of the army battalion.

Expedition

Abu Musa chased the enemy and killed them. He also captured captives, men, women and children, as well as war booty.

The event is mentioned by the Muslim Jurist Muhammad ibn Jarir al-Tabari as follows:

See also
Military career of Muhammad
List of expeditions of Muhammad

References

630
Campaigns ordered by Muhammad